The pambai or pamba (Tamil: பம்பை) is a pair of cylindrical drums used in temple festivals and folk music in Tamil Nadu and Andhra Pradesh, India.

There is a small community in southern Andhra who plays this instrument: the Pambalas. This unit of two drums is held near the waist of the player or put on the floor, and beaten with sticks, or with a hand  and a stick. In the simpler varieties, both drums are made of wood, but there is a pambai in which one drum is of wood and the other of brass: the wooden one is known as veeru vanam and the metal drum as vengala pambai. The pambai is played in the traditional ensemble naiyandi melam.

References
 South Asia : The Indian Subcontinent. (Garland Encyclopedia of World Music, Volume 5). Routledge; Har/Com edition (November 1999).

External links

Indian musical instruments
Membranophones